The Sound and Music Computing (SMC) Conference is the forum for international exchanges around the core interdisciplinary topics of Sound and Music Computing. The conference is held annually to facilitate the exchange of ideas in this field.

Focus topics
This sections speaks briefly about subfields related to Sound and Music Computing, for the main article, see Sound and music computing.

Sound and Music Computing (SMC) is a research field that studies the whole sound and music communication chain from a multidisciplinary point of view. The current SMC research field can be grouped into a number of subfields that focus on specific aspects of the sound and music communication chain.

 Processing of sound and music signals: This subfield focuses on audio signal processing techniques for the analysis, transformation and resynthesis of sound and music signals.
 Understanding and modeling sound and music: This subfield focuses on understanding and modeling sound and music using computational approaches. Here we can include Computational musicology, Music information retrieval, and the more computational approaches of Music cognition.
 Interfaces for sound and music: This subfield focuses on the design and implementation of computer interfaces for sound and music. This is basically related to Human Computer Interaction.
 Assisted sound and music creation: This subfield focuses on the development of computer tools for assisting Sound design and Music composition. Here we can include traditional fields like Algorithmic composition.

Past SMC Conferences
 SMC 2022: 07-11 June 2022, St-Etienne, France
 SMC 2021: 29 June-01 July 2021, Online
 SMC 2020: 24-26 June 2020, Online
 SMC 2019: 28-31 May 2019, Málaga, Spain
 SMC 2018: 04-07 July 2018, Limassol, Cyprus
 SMC 2017: 01-04 July 2017, Helsinki, Finland
 SMC 2016: 31 August-03 September 2016, Hamburg, Germany
 SMC 2015: 26 July-01 August 2015, Maynooth, Ireland
 SMC 2014 (joint with ICMC): 14-20 September, Athens, Greece
 SMC 2013 (join with SMAC): 30 July-03 August, Stockholm, Sweden
 SMC 2012: 11–14 July 2012, Copenhagen, Denmark
 SMC 2011: 06–09 July 2011, Padova, Italy
 SMC 2010: 21–24 July 2010, Barcelona, Spain
 SMC 2009: 23–25 July 2009, Porto, Portugal
 SMC 2008: 31 July-03 August 2008, Berlin, Germany
 SMC 2007: 11–13 July 2007, Lefkada, Greece
 SMC 2006: 18–20 May 2006, Marseille, France
 SMC 2005: 24–26 November 2005, Salerno, Italy
 SMC 2004: 20–22 October 2004, Paris, France

All SMC proceedings are available in the SMC Community on the open-access repository Zenodo. For more up-to-date information on the SMC conferences refer to its website.

The SMC Summer School
Each year, along with the conference, the SMC summer school is conducted. It promotes interdisciplinary education and research in the field of Sound and Music Computing. It is aimed at graduate students working on their Master or PhD thesis, but it is also open to any person carrying out research in this field.

Related Summer Schools
 International Summer School of Systematic Musicology
 Darmstadt School
 European Summer School in Information Retrieval
 IEEE Signal Processing Society Summer School on Game Audio
 International Hamburg Summerschool for Filmmusic, Gamemusic and Sounddesign
 International Summer School on Computational Musicology of the International Association for the Study of Popular Music
 Oticon Audiology Summer Camp
 Utrecht Summer School in Music Information Retrieval (USMIR)

See also
 Sound and Music Computing
 International Conference on Digital Audio Effects
 International Society for Music Information Retrieval

Notes

Computer science conferences
Music conferences
Music technology